Bloke is  a slang term for a man.

Bloke may also refer to:
 Bloke (comics), a character in the Marvel Universe
 Municipality of Bloke, a municipality in southwestern Slovenia
 Bloke Plateau, a plateau in southwestern Slovenia
 "Bloke", a 2000 comedy song by Chris Franklin

See also
 Blokesworld, an Australian television series
 England, Half-English, only collaboration album by Billy Bragg and The Blokes
 Tim Mathieson, partner of Australian Prime Minister Julia Gillard known informally as "First Bloke"
 William Modisane or Bloke Modisane, South African writer, actor and journalist